The CompuMate SV010 was a home computer peripheral manufactured by Spectravideo International for the Atari 2600 home video game console. It was released on 6 January 1983 at the Winter Consumer Electronics Show in Las Vegas, Nevada.

In Germany, the CompuMate was marketed by Quelle, a catalogue company, as the Universum Heimcomputer. In Brazil (circa 1985), at least two clones of CompuMate were made: the Dactar-Comp by Milmar Electronics, and the CompuGame.

Hardware
The ComputeMate consists of a membrane keyboard, output interfaces, and read-only internal storage. It connects to the console's module slot and to both controller ports. The user could optionally place the ComputeMate on top of the console—although not when used with the Atari 2600 Jr. model.

The CompuMate has a 3.5-mm phone connector in order to connect a Compact Cassette unit for non-volatile data storage. Its read-only memory is preinstalled with three computer programs.

PAL and NTSC versions of the CompuMate were manufactured.

Software
The CompuMate has three simple computer programs in its internal read-only memory:

 Magic Easel, a drawing and animation program with a 40×40-pixel canvas and 10 selectable colors. It can animate up to nine frames in a repeating loop. It has two demonstration pictures: a world map and a snowman.
 Music Composer, a software synthesizer with four demonstration songs: "Twinkle, Twinkle, Little Star", "Long, Long Ago", "Jingle Bells", and "My Bonnie".
 Microsoft BASIC editor and interpreter

Spectravideo only published two programs for the CompuMate on Compact Cassette,  PictureMate (1983) and SongMate (1983).

See also
 BASIC Programming cartridge for the Atari 2600

References

External links
Spectravideo CompuMate, Oldcomputers.net
Atari 2600 VCS CompuMate, scans of instructions

The CompuMate List(Loadable programs) - Atari 2600 - AtariAge Forums
CompuMate Basic Programs
Stella -- A multi-platform Atari 2600 Emulator Supports CompuMate emulation.
z26 -- An Atari 2600 Emulator Supports CompuMate emulation.

Home computers
Atari 2600
Products introduced in 1983
BASIC programming language family